Domenico Belisario de Bellis (2 March 1647 – 17 January 1701) was a Roman Catholic prelate who served as Bishop of Molfetta (1696–1701).

Biography
Domenico Belisario de Bellis was born in Turi, Apulia, Italy on 2 March 1647.
He was ordained a deacon on 21 December 1669 and ordained a priest on 20 September 1670. On 23 January 1696, he was appointed during the papacy of Pope Innocent XII as Bishop of Molfetta. On 25 February 1696, he was consecrated bishop by Bandino Panciatici, Cardinal-Priest of San Pancrazio, with Carlo Loffredo, Archbishop of Bari-Canosa, and Giovanni Battista Visconti Aicardi, Bishop of Novara, serving as co-consecrators. He served as Bishop of Molfetta until his death on 17 January 1701.

Episcopal succession

References

External links and additional sources
 (for Chronology of Bishops) 
 (for Chronology of Bishops) 

17th-century Italian Roman Catholic bishops
18th-century Italian Roman Catholic bishops
Bishops appointed by Pope Innocent XII
Bishops of Molfetta
1647 births
1701 deaths